Mhasoba, pronounced "MUH-SO-BAA", is a horned buffalo deity of pastoral tribes in Western and Southern India. In Maharashtra, many Gawlis (tribes making their living cow-herding and by selling milk and milk products) have been worshipping this deity for hundreds of years.

Rosalind O'Hanlon, Professor at the University of Oxford stated that Mhasoba is traditionally very popular in the Maratha caste. She quotes about the devotion of the Marathas in the 19th century to Mhasoba as follows:
Mhasoba is also worshiped by the Bhonsles. There is a shrine of Mhasoba at the Purandar Fort and there is also a beautiful water reservoir nearby that is named after him i.e. 'Mhasoba Taki'.

Mhasoba's shrines are not Brahminical and there is nothing written about him in Sanskrit literature. He is considered a "kshetrapal" i.e. guardian deity worshiped by farmers. He is also considered a "guardian brother of the seven river goddesses termed as Sati-Asara"

Mhasoba is sometime connected with Shiva, who may have been a pre-Vedic deity adopted by Hindu culture. In the Mhasoba cult of Maharashtra, Mhasoba (Mahisha/Mahesha, which is another name for Shiva/Shankar) is worshipped with his wife Jogubai (Durga).

References

External links
www.shrimhasobamaharaj.org
www.aghori.it

Regional Hindu gods
Forms of Shiva